Subscription Mill is a commercially working tower mill at North Leverton, Nottinghamshire that was built in 1813.

History
Subscription Mill was built in 1813 by local farmers to mill their grain. It served the villages of Fenton, Habblesthorpe, North Leverton and Sturton le Steeple. The Subscription Mill Company was formed. The mill was built to grind corn for members of the company, and also for local farmers and the poor. In 1884, the mill was extended and gained an extra floor. The windmill has continued to work through all of its life, making it unique. In 1956, a new limited company was formed. In July 1959, a sail was struck by lightning and damaged. Repairs costing £3,000 were carried out with a grant and loan from Nottinghamshire County Council, and grants from the Council for the Preservation of Rural England, the Ministry of Works and Retford Rural District Council. The works were carried out by Thompson's, the Alford, Lincolnshire millwrights. The mill was again struck by lightning in 1972. The mill was repaired the next year.

Description
The mill has four floors and is built to the Lincolnshire style. It has four Patent sails mounted on a cross, an Ogee cap and an eight bladed fantail. There are three sets of millstones, two of which are wind-driven, and one set driven from an external engine/tractor.

Public access
The windmill is entirely maintained by a group of volunteers, and is open to the public every Saturday and Sunday throughout the year. Admission is free but there is a donation box towards the upkeep of the mill. There are open weekends in the summer with a wide variety of attractions for visitors to see.

References

External links
 Official website

Windmills in Nottinghamshire
Tower mills in the United Kingdom
Grinding mills in the United Kingdom
Windmills completed in 1813